Lal Nishan Party (Red Flag Party, LNP) was a communist political party in the Indian state of Maharashtra. It was founded in 1965.

• LNP's main work was trade union activism. The trade union of the party was called Sarva Shramik Sangh (SSS).

• The party publication was called Nave Parva. Earlier, SSS published a Marathi daily newspaper from Pune called Shramik Vichar.

• During the 1980s, LNP developed a close cooperation with Kamgar Aghadi.

• In 1988, a split occurred when a hardline section, critical of the Perestroika, broke away and formed Lal Nishan Party (Leninvadi).

• LNP participated in the Confederation of Indian Communists and Democratic Socialists.

• In 2017 August, LNP merged with the Communist Party of India.

References

Political parties in Maharashtra
Defunct communist parties in India
Communist Party of India breakaway groups
Political parties established in 1965
Political parties disestablished in 2017
2017 disestablishments in India